Sunniva Skoglund (born 22 May 2002) is a Norwegian football player from Porsgrunn who plays as a goalkeeper for Stabæk. She is part of the team that represented Norway in the Euro 2022 in England.

Club career 
Already at the age of 16, she stood out as a good goalkeeper for Urædd in the First Division. Before the 2019 season she changed club to Snøgg where she kept playing almost every match in first division.

In December 2019, it got official that she just had signed for Stabæk, which was just relegated from Toppserien to the First Division. She then became the successor to the keeper legend Ingrid Hjelmseth who retired after the 2019 season. Skoglund was a part when Stabæk got promoted back to Toppserien, and she had her debut in that league in May 2021.

International career 
Skoglund has played matches for the U15, U16, U18, U19 and U23 Norwegian national football teams. In February 2022, she was picked for the first time for the Norwegian national team to be part of the team that participated in Algarve Cup. She was also selected in March 2022 to be part of the team for the qualification for the next World Cup.

She was called up to represent Norway in the Euro 2022 as one of three goalkeepers, and as the youngest player on the team.

References

External links 

 
 

2002 births
Living people
People from Porsgrunn
Stabæk Fotball players
Norwegian women's footballers
Norway women's youth international footballers
Women's association football goalkeepers
UEFA Women's Euro 2022 players